Castellfollit may refer to the following places in Spain:
Castellfollit de la Roca, a municipality in the comarca of Garrotxa, in the Province of Girona, Catalonia
Castellfollit de Riubregós, a municipality in the comarca of the Anoia in Catalonia
Castellfollit del Boix, a village in the province of Barcelona and autonomous community of Catalonia